Pokrovka is a rural locality (a selo) in Nikolo-Alexandrovsky Selsoviet of Oktyabrsky District, Amur Oblast, Russia. The population was 135 as of 2018. There are 2 streets.

Geography 
Pokrovka is located 47 km southwest of Yekaterinoslavka (the district's administrative centre) by road. Nikolo-Alexandrovka is the nearest rural locality.

References 

Rural localities in Oktyabrsky District, Amur Oblast